Keith Nakasone (born January 20, 1956) is a former competitive judoka and native of Okinawa, Japan. Nakasone is a four time (1974–1977) national collegiate judo champion at San Jose State University competing in the 132 lbs division.  In 1978, Keith suffered a serious ankle injury. Nakasone qualified for the 1980 U.S. Olympic team but did not compete due to the U.S. Olympic Committee's boycott of the 1980 Summer Olympics in Moscow, Soviet Union. He is one of 461 U.S. Olympians to receive a Congressional Gold Medal as a member of the 1980 Olympic team.

References

Living people
1956 births
American male judoka
American people of Okinawan descent
Congressional Gold Medal recipients
American sportspeople of Japanese descent